Nucleolar complex protein 2 homolog is a protein that in humans is encoded by the NOC2L gene.

References

Further reading